Raimo Otto Kalervo Lahti (born 12 January 1946) has been professor of Criminal Law at the University of Helsinki since 1979 and has been involved with reform of the Finnish Medical Law and Criminal Law. He has served as an expert for committees of the Finnish Parliament and the Finnish National Authority for Medicolegal Affairs (TEO). Between 2005 and 2009 he was an ad litem Judge to the International Criminal court for the former Yugoslavia (ICTY)

References
Kuka kukin on 2007 (Who's Who in Finland), Otava, Finland, 2006.
Homepage of Raimo Lahti

Living people
1946 births
20th-century Finnish lawyers
21st-century Finnish judges
Academic staff of the University of Helsinki
Scholars of medical law
Finnish legal scholars